George Sanderson may refer to:

George P. Sanderson (1848–1892), big game hunter in India
George Henry Sanderson (1824–1893), mayor of San Francisco
George Sanderson (politician) (1810–1886), mayor of Lancaster, Pennsylvania
George Pringle Sanderson (1850–1940), Canadian politician from Alberta
George G. Sanderson (1840–1919), insurance broker, shipowner and political figure in Nova Scotia, Canada
George K. Sanderson (1844–1893), U.S. Army officer
George Plaisted Sanderson (1836–1915), mayor of Lynn, Massachusetts
George Sanderson, a character in the film Monsters, Inc.